Stibara morbillosa is a species of beetle in the family Cerambycidae. It was described by Johan Christian Fabricius in 1798, originally under the genus Saperda. It is known from India.

References

Saperdini
Beetles described in 1798